Pete Robertson (born December 2, 1992) is an American football linebacker for the Saskatchewan Roughriders of the Canadian Football League (CFL). He played college football at Texas Tech. He signed with the Seattle Seahawks as an undrafted free agent in 2016. He has also played for the Washington Redskins and Arizona Cardinals.

Professional career

Seattle Seahawks
Robertson signed with the Seattle Seahawks as an undrafted free agent on May 9, 2016. He was waived by the Seahawks on August 30, 2016.

Washington Redskins
On January 6, 2017, Robertson signed a reserve/future contract with the Washington Redskins. He was waived by the Redskins on September 2, 2017 and was signed to the practice squad the next day. He was promoted to the active roster on November 21, 2017. He was waived by the Redskins on December 4, 2017 and re-signed to the practice squad. He was promoted again to the active roster on December 12, 2017.

On September 1, 2018, Robertson was waived for final roster cuts before the start of the 2018 season.

Arizona Cardinals
On December 19, 2018, Robertson was signed to the Arizona Cardinals practice squad. He signed a reserve/future contract with the Cardinals on December 31, 2018.

On September 1, 2019, Robertson was waived by the Cardinals and re-signed to the practice squad. On November 8, 2019, Robertson was promoted to the active roster. He was waived on December 3, 2019.

Washington Redskins (II)
On December 10, 2019, Robertson was signed to the Washington Redskins practice squad. His practice squad contract with the team expired on January 6, 2020.

Saskatchewan Roughriders
Robertson signed with the Saskatchewan Roughriders of the Canadian Football League on February 19, 2020. After the CFL canceled the 2020 season due to the COVID-19 pandemic, Robertson chose to opt-out of his contract with the Roughriders on August 28, 2020. He opted back in to his contract on January 7, 2021. Robertson played in 11 regular season games for the Riders during the 2021 season, contributing with 10 defensive tackles, two special teams tackles and five quarterback sacks. The following season he missed four games in the middle of the season with a foot sprain.

The following season he was resigned on a 1 year deal to stay with the Roughriders for the 2023-24 Season.

Personal life
Robertson's older god-brother is former Redskins wide receiver Malcolm Kelly.

References

External links
Washington Redskins bio
CFL.ca bio

1992 births
Living people
Players of American football from Texas
People from Longview, Texas
American football linebackers
Texas Tech Red Raiders football players
Seattle Seahawks players
Washington Redskins players
Arizona Cardinals players
Saskatchewan Roughriders players